is a mountain located at the northwestern foot of Mount Fuji, in Fujikawaguchiko, Minamitsuru District, Yamanashi Prefecture.

It is one of the many extinct volcanoes of Mount Fuji, and because it is located at the gentle foot of Mount Fuji, it looks like an independent peak. There is a crater depression at the top. It is located on the south side of Aokigahara, and is dotted with wind holes such as Motosu Wind Cave, Omuro Wind Cave, and Kamukura Wind Cave. There is no mountain trail to Mt. Omuro, and the top is surrounded by forests and the view is poor. In addition, since it is designated as a wildlife sanctuary and national park special protected area, the collection of insects and wildflowers is prohibited.

References

Mountains of Yamanashi Prefecture
Fuji-Hakone-Izu National Park
Volcanoes of Yamanashi Prefecture